The Sluggard may refer to:

 a bronze statue of Giuseppe Valona, by Lord Frederic Leighton
 a moralistic poem by Isaac Watts: see wikisource:The Sluggard (Watts)